Watkin Williams may refer to:

 Charles James Watkin Williams (1828–1884), Welsh judge, doctor and Liberal politician
 Watkin Williams (bishop) (1845–1944), Dean of St Asaph and Bishop of Bangor
 Watkin Williams (1742–1808), Welsh politician and administrator
 Watkin Hezekiah Williams (1844–1905), Welsh schoolmaster and poet

See also
Watkin Williams-Wynn (disambiguation)